The following artists (musicians or bands) have had releases with the independent record label Nuclear Blast.

A

 Accept (ex)
 After Forever (ex)
 Agathodaimon (ex)
 Agnostic Front (ex)
 Alcest
 Alesana (after Artery Recordings and Revival Recordings lost the band)
 All Shall Perish (ex)
 Almanac (ex)
 Am I Blood (ex)
 Amaranthe
 Amorphis (ex)
 Anthem
 Anthrax (EU only)
 Arsis (US only)
 Ashes of Ares (ex)
 As I Lay Dying
 Augury (US only)
 Auri
 Avantasia
 Avatarium

B
 Bal-Sagoth (ex)
 Battle Beast
 Battlecross (ex)
 Beast in Black
 Behemoth
 Belphegor
 Benediction
 Biohazard
 Blackbriar
 Black Star Riders
 Blackguard (Europe only) (ex)
 Bleed from Within
 Bleed the Sky (ex)
 Bleeding Through (Europe only) (ex)
 Blind Guardian
 Blues Pills
 Brujeria
 Before the Dawn
 Broken Teeth
 Bury Tomorrow (ex)

C
 Callejon (ex)
 Candlemass (ex)
 Carcass 
 Carnifex
 Cathedral (ex)
 Cellar Darling
 Children of Bodom (ex)
 Chimaira (Cleveland Ohio)  (ex)
 Cipher System
 Chrome Division
 Clawfinger(ex)
 Coldseed (ex)
 Communic 
 Comeback Kid
 Conjurer
 Control Denied (ex)
 Corrosion of Conformity
 Cradle of Filth
 Crematory (ex)
 Crobot
 Crucified Barbara (US only)

D
 The Damned Things
 Danzig (ex)
 Darkane (ex)
 Darkseed (ex)
 Dark Sermon (ex)
 David Shankle Group (ex)
 Death (ex)
 Death Angel 
 Deathstars
 Decapitated 
 Decrepit Birth
 Defecation 
 Demonaz
 Demonoid (ex)
 Destruction (ex)
 Despised Icon
 Devilment
 Devil You Know
 Dew-Scented (ex)
 Diablo Boulevard
 Die Apokalyptischen Reiter
 Dimmu Borgir
 Disbelief (ex)
 Discharge
 Disharmonic Orchestra (ex)
 Dismal Euphony (ex)
 Dismember (ex)
 Dissection (ex)
 Divinity (ex)
 Doro
 Dreadful Shadows (USA Only)

E
 Earthless
 Echoes of Eternity (ex)
 Edguy
 Ektomorf (ex)
 Eluveitie
 Enforcer
 Enslaved
 Emperor (ex)
 Epica
 Equilibrium
 Ex Deo (ex)
 Exodus
 Exhorder
 Eyes Set To Kill

F
 Face Down (ex)
 Fallujah
 Farmer Boys (ex)
 Fear Factory
 Filter (ex)
 Fireball Ministry (ex)
 Fit for an Autopsy
 Fleshgod Apocalypse
 Flotsam and Jetsam (ex)
 Forbidden
 For Today (ex)

G
 Gardenian (ex)
 Generation Kill
 Ghost Bath
 Godgory (ex)
 Golem (ex)
 Gorefest (ex)
 Gorgoroth (ex)
 Gotthard
 Grand Magus
 Grave Digger (ex)
 Graveworm
 Graveyard

H
 Hackneyed (ex)
 HammerFall (ex)
 The Halo Effect
 Hatebreed
 Hardcore Superstar
 Heathen
 Hell
 The Hellacopters
 Helloween (ex)
 Helltrain (ex)
 Hollow (ex)
 Holy Grail
 Horde (ex)
 Hypocrisy

I
 I
 Illuminate (ex)
 Immortal (ex)
 In Flames
 Immolation
 Indica

K
 Kadavar
 Kataklysm
 Keep of Kalessin (ex)
 Khemmis
 Killer Be Killed
 Knorkator (ex)
 Korpiklaani
 The Kovenant (ex)
 Kreator

L
 Lacrimosa (United States only)
 Lamb of God
 Light the Torch
 Like Moths to Flames (ex)
 Lingua Mortis Orchestra
 Liquido (ex)
 Lock Up
 Lordi (ex)
 Lovebites
 Luca Turilli's Rhapsody

M
 M.O.D. (ex)
 Machine Head
 Madball
 Malevolent Creation (ex)
 Mandragora Scream (ex)
 Manowar (ex)
 Mantic Ritual (ex)
 Master (ex)
 MaYan
 Melechesh
 Mendeed (ex)
 Meshuggah (ex)
 Metal Allegiance
 Ministry
 Misery Index (ex)
 Mnemic (ex)
 Mortification (ex)
 Municipal Waste
 My Dying Bride
 Mystic Prophecy (ex)

N
 Nails
 Narnia (ex)
 Nightwish (ex)
 Nile
 Nokturnal Mortum (ex)
 NorthTale
 Northward
 Nothing Left

O
 Obscura
 Omnium Gatherum (ex)
 One Man Army and the Undead Quartet (ex)
 Opeth (ex)
 Opprobrium (ex)
 Orchid
 Origin
 Orphanage (ex)
 Overkill

P
 Pain
 Paradise Lost
 Pegazus (ex)
 Phil Campbell and the Bastard Sons
 Possessed 
 Primal Fear (ex)
 Prime STH (ex)
 Pro-Pain (ex)
 Psycroptic
 Pungent Stench (ex)
 Pyogenesis (ex)

R
 Rage
 Raise Hell (ex)
 Raunchy (ex)
 ReVamp (ex)
 Rhapsody of Fire (ex)
 Ride the Sky (ex)
 Rings of Saturn (ex)
 Rob Zombie
 Rise of the Northstar (ex)

S
 S.O.D. (ex)
 Sabaton
 Samael (ex)
 Satyricon (ex)
 Savatage (United States only)
 Scar Symmetry
 Scorpion Child
 Secret Sphere (ex)
 Sepultura
 Sinergy (ex)
 Sinister (ex)
 Sinner (ex)
 Sirenia (ex)
 Skyclad (ex)
 Slaughter (ex)
 Slayer (ex)
 Slipknot (band) 
 Soilwork
 Sonata Arctica (ex)
 Sonic Syndicate (ex)
 Soulfly
 Speckmann Project (ex)
 Stahlhammer (ex)
 Steel Prophet (ex)
 Stormwitch (ex)
 Stratovarius (ex)
 Subway To Sally (ex)
 Success Will Write Apocalypse Across the Sky (ex)
 Such A Surge (ex)
 Suffocation
 Suicide Silence (ex)
 Suicidal Tendencies (ex)
 Susperia (ex)
 Swashbuckle (ex)
 Sylosis
 Symphony X

T
 Tankard (ex)
 Tarot
 Tasters (ex)
 Terror 2000 (ex)
 Testament
 Texas in July (Europe only)
 Textures
 Theatre of Tragedy (ex)
 The 69 Eyes
 The Abyss (ex)
 The Accüsed (ex)
 The Adicts
 The Black League (ex)
 The Crinn (US only)
 The Defiled
 The Duskfall (ex)
 The Exploited
 The Halo Effect
 The Hellacopters
 The Night Flight Orchestra
 The Vintage Caravan
 The Charm The Fury
 Therion 
 Threat Signal
 Threshold
 Thunderstone (ex)
 Thy Art Is Murder
 Tiamat (ex)
 Timo Tolkki (ex)
 To/Die/For (ex)
 Tuomas Holopainen
 Turilli / Lione Rhapsody
 Twilight Force

U
 Unleashed

V
 Vader 
Vein.fm 
 Venom Inc.
 Voivod

W
 Warmen (ex)
 Warrior (ex)
 Watain
 We Came as Romans (Europe only)
 Wednesday 13
 While Heaven Wept
 White Skull (ex)
 Winter (ex)
 Wintersun
 Witchcraft
 Witchery (ex)
 Within Temptation
 Wolf Hoffmann
 World Under Blood

References 

Nuclear Blast